Richard Beland (30 November 1896 – 27 February 1970) was a South African boxer. He competed at the 1920 Summer Olympics and the 1924 Summer Olympics.

References

External links
 

1896 births
1970 deaths
South African male boxers
Olympic boxers of South Africa
Boxers at the 1920 Summer Olympics
Boxers at the 1924 Summer Olympics
Boxers from Johannesburg
South African Republic people
Lightweight boxers